Vena Records was an American record label located in Madison, Alabama in the late 1950s. Three singles are thought to have been released by the label.

Singles

Marlon "Madman" Mitchell and the Rocketeers
"Bermuda Shorts" / "Ice Cold Baby" (1957)
Both songs were written by Billy Hogan.

Billy Hogan and The Twilighters
"Shake It Over Sputnik" / "I Don't Want Anything But Your Love" (1958) 
Both songs were written by Billy Hogan.

The Sacred-Aires Quartet
"I Can't Be Satisfied" / "We're Sailing Along" (1960) 
Performed by The Sacred Aires Quartet, side one was written by Alton Delmore, probably the last song he wrote. Side two was written by James Holland. The piano player on the session was David Vest.

See also
List of record labels
Madison, Alabama

References

American record labels
Record labels established in 1957
Record labels disestablished in 1958